"Got Myself Together" is a house music track by The Bucketheads, released in late 1995. It was the commercial follow-up to global hit The Bomb! (These Sounds Fall into My Mind), and was the third single taken from the project's sole album All in the Mind.

While unable to reach the worldwide chart highs of its predecessor, the single was a club hit, reaching #1 on the Billboard Hot Dance Club Play chart in January 1996, and a moderate commercial hit, reaching the top 10 in Finland and Sweden, and the top 20 in the UK. The track is considered a 1990s house classic.

Background
"Got Myself Together" is a disco-inspired house track based around a prominent sample of Brass Construction's 1976 hit, Movin'. In Europe, the lead single version was a remix by British house group Hustlers Convention, an early alias of DJs Michael Gray & Jon Pearn, now known as Full Intention.

In April 2019, Positiva released a new remix by EJECA as part of its 25th anniversary series. The remix gained heavy rotation from the likes of The Black Madonna, and Annie Mac & Danny Howard on BBC Radio 1.

Critical reception
Charles Aaron from Spin said that, in comparison to "The Bomb!," the single "gets knee-deeper in jazzy acid-funk."

Music video
Like its predecessor, the music video for "Got Myself Together" was directed by Guy Ritchie and Alex de Rakoff. The video features a Londoner en route to Heathrow Airport, stopping at sights including Buckingham Palace and Piccadilly Circus, before arriving in New York in search of a disco club.

Track listings

 US CD maxi single
 "Got Myself Together" (Kenlou Mix) - 5:12
 "Got Myself Together" (Todd Terry Club Mix) - 5:04
 "Got Myself Together" (LP Version) - 5:35
 "Got Myself Together" (Nord Solo Mix) - 5:14
 "Time And Space" - 5:20
 "Sunset" - 5:37

UK & EU CD maxi single
 "Got Myself Together" (Hustlers Convention Radio Edit) - 3:35
 "Got Myself Together" (Masters At Work Edit) - 3:34
 "Got Myself Together" (Todd Terry Mix) - 6:22
 "Got Myself Together" (Hustlers Convention Bass Dub) - 4:43
 "Got Myself Together" (Hustlers Convention Club Mix) - 6:29
 "Got Myself Together" (Kenlou Mix) - 8:23
 "Got Myself Together" (Bucket Beats) - 4:34
UK cassette single
 "Got Myself Together" (Hustlers Convention Radio Edit) - 3:35
 "Got Myself Together" (Masters At Work Edit) - 3:34
 "Got Myself Together" (Todd Terry Mix) - 6:22
 "Got Myself Together" (Bucket Beats) - 4:34

US 12" vinyl
 "Got Myself Together" (Kenlou Mix) - 8:23
 "Got Myself Together" (Nord Mix) - 8:20
 "Got Myself Together" (Todd Terry Mix) - 6:22
 "Got Myself Together" (Bucket Beats) - 4:34
 "Sunset" - 5:37
UK 12" vinyl
 "Got Myself Together" (Kenlou Mix) - 8:23
 "Got Myself Together" (Hustlers Convention Bass Dub) - 4:43
 "Got Myself Together" (Hustlers Convention Club Mix) - 6:29
 "Got Myself Together" (Todd Terry Mix) - 6:22
UK 12" vinyl (2019 issue)
 "Got Myself Together" (Kenlou Mix) - 8:23
 "Got Myself Together" (Ejeca Rework) - 5:50
 "Got Myself Together" (Hustlers Convention Bass Dub) - 4:43

Charts

Weekly charts

Year-end charts

References 

1996 songs